1976 in philosophy

Events

Publications
Heidegger's interview with Der Spiegel under the title Only a God Can Save Us
 Belnap, Nuel and Steel, T. The Logic of Questions and Answers. New Haven: Yale University Press.
 Bennett, Jonathan. Linguistic Behaviour. Cambridge: Cambridge University Press.
 Frye, Marilyn. "On saying." American Philosophical Quarterly 13: 123–127.
 Goodman, Nelson. Languages of Art (2nd ed.), Indianapolis: Hackett.
 Harnish, Robert M. "Logical form and implicature." In: An Integrated Theory of Linguistic Ability, ed. T. G. Bever, J. J. Katz & T. Langedoen, pp. 313–92. New York: Thomas Y. Crowell.
 Hornsby, Jennifer. "Proper Names: A Defense of Burge." Philosophical Studies 30: 227–234.
 Loar, Brian. "The Semantics of Singular Terms." Philosophical Studies 30: 353–377.
 Newell, Allen and Simon, H. A. "Computer Science as Empirical Inquiry: Symbols and Search." Communications of the Association for Computing Machinery 19: 113–126.
 Soames, Scott. A Critical Examination of Frege's Theory of Presupposition and Contemporary Alternatives. PhD thesis, MIT Dept. of Linguistics and Philosophy.
 Unger, Roberto M. Law in Modern Society: Toward a Criticism of Social Theory.  Free Press.

Births

Deaths
 February 22 - Michael Polanyi (born 1891)

 
20th-century philosophy
Philosophy by year